This is a list of the Leaders of the British Whig Party. It begins in 1830 as, in the words of J C Sainty, 'it would be misleading to convey the impression that there was in any precise sense a Leader of the Whig Party in the House of Lords before 1830'. Also, Cook & Stevenson, British Historical Facts 1760–1830 have no section for party leaders in either House of Parliament.  The section on 'Overall Leaders' gives details of those who were either the Prime Minister or a former Prime Minister who was still in Parliament and leading the Whig Party in the House in which he sat.

Overall Leaders of the Whig Party, 1830–1859

Leaders of the Whig Party in the House of Commons, 1830–1859

Leaders of the Whig Party in the House of Lords, 1830–1859

Notes and references

Leaders